Kimball is an unincorporated community in Page County, in the U.S. state of Virginia. It was named for Frederick J. Kimball, an early president of the Norfolk and Western Railway.

References

Unincorporated communities in Virginia
Unincorporated communities in Page County, Virginia